Last Present (lit. "Present" or "Gift") is a 2001 South Korean film. Directed by Oh Ki-hwan, it tells the tale of Yong-ki (Lee Jung-jae), a struggling comedian who continues to see parallels between his disintegrating relationship with his wife, Jung-yeon (Lee Young-ae), and the characters he's playing on the stage.

Plot 
The film traces the romance, marriage and estrangement of a down-and-out comedian, Yong-ki (Lee Jung-jae) and his long-suffering wife, Jung-yeon (Lee Young-ae). Both of them defied his parents to get married but it seems his parents' fears that things will never work out are coming true. Yong-ki hides behind a facade of optimism even as he turns down boring job offers in the hopes that his comedic talent will be noticed on a famous talent show he's auditioning for. Meanwhile, Jung-yeon has to support them both as well as bear the pain of a miscarriage that Yong-ki is trying his best to forget. To make matters worse, Jung-yeon discovers that she's dying from a terminal disease and though Yong-ki suspects that something is wrong, she never tells him about her illness. Through the silent suffering and the estrangement, both husband and wife believe their marriage is over. But what they fail to notice until it is too late is that they still love each other deeply but both have been overcome by the trials life has thrown at them.

Cast 
Lee Jung-jae as Jung Yong-ki
Lee Young-ae as Park Jung-yeon
Kwon Hae-hyo as Hak-soo
Lee Mu-hyeon as Hak-chul
Gong Hyung-jin as Chul-soo
Yun Jin-young as Jin-young
Sa Hyeon-jin as Hye-jung
Lee In-chul as Teacher Kwak Hyung-min
Lee Moon-sik as Young-man
Ku Hye-ryung as Ae-sook
Kim Sung-kyum sd Yong-ki's father
Park Seung-tae as Yong-ki's mother
Maeng Sang-hoon as PD Hwang
Chu Kwi-jung as PD Hwang's wife
Oh Seung-jun as young Yong-ki
Jang Mi-na as young Jung-yeon
Jung Hwa-young as young Ae-sook 
Jang Heon-gwang as young Young-man
Kim Tae-hee as teenage Jung-yeon 
Yu Min-jeong as teenage Ae-sook
Park Hwi-soon as Comedian
Kim Byung-man as Comedian
Kim Su-ro as Yoo-sik (cameo)
Hong Seok-cheon (cameo)
Kim Young-bae as Kwang-sik (cameo)
Gong Hyo-jin as Female MC (cameo)
Kim Sang-jin as Yoo-sik's manager (cameo)

References

External links 
 
 
 

2001 films
2000s Korean-language films
South Korean romantic drama films
2000s South Korean films